First Glance is the seventh studio album by Canadian rock band April Wine, released in March 1978. First Glance became April Wine's first gold record outside Canada. The album spawned the hit single "Roller" and was a hit in Flint, Michigan and radio listeners there made "Roller" a top requested song. It ended up as a top forty hit in the States. After the release of First Glance, bands such as Rush, Journey, and Styx all requested for April Wine to open their shows in the United States.

Canadian track listing
All tracks written by Myles Goodwyn unless otherwise noted.
 "Hot on the Wheels of Love" (M. Goodwyn, S. Lang) – 3:14
 "Get Ready for Love" – 4:25
 "Rock n' Roll is a Vicious Game" – 3:10
 "Right Down to It" (B. Greenway) – 3:03
 "Roller" – 4:19
 "Comin' Right Down on Top of Me" – 4:10
 "I'm Alive" – 2:55
 "Let Yourself Go" – 2:56
 "Silver Dollar" – 5:14

This version is only available in Canada.

Note: both versions of the CD have the first two tracks in the opposite order.

US/UK track listing
All tracks written by Myles Goodwyn unless otherwise noted.
 "Get Ready for Love" – 4:25
 "Hot on the Wheels of Love" (M. Goodwyn, S. Lang) – 3:14
 "Rock n' Roll is a Vicious Game" – 3:10
 "Right Down to It" (B. Greenway) – 3:03
 "Roller" – 4:19
 "Comin' Right Down on Top of Me" – 4:10
 "I'm Alive" – 2:55
 "Let Yourself Go" – 2:56
 "Silver Dollar" – 5:14

 The picture on the cover of the American version is also used on the album covers of Greatest Hits (1979), The Hits (1987), and Classic Masters (2002).

Personnel
 Myles Goodwyn – lead & background vocals, guitar, keyboards
 Steve Lang – bass, background vocals
 Brian Greenway – lead & background vocals, guitar, slide guitar, harmonica
 Jerry Mercer – drums & percussion
 Gary Moffet – guitar, slide guitar

Production
Mastering by George Marino at Sterling Sound, NYC

References

April Wine albums
1978 albums
Aquarius Records (Canada) albums
Capitol Records albums
Albums produced by Myles Goodwyn